Mary Schmidt Campbell (born October 21, 1947), is an American academic administrator and museum curator. She began her tenure as the 10th president of Spelman College on August 1, 2015. Prior to this position, Schmidt Campbell held several positions in New York City's cultural sector.

Early life and education 
Schmidt Campbell was born to Elaine and Harvey Schmidt in Philadelphia, Pennsylvania on October 21, 1947.

She attended Philadelphia High School for Girls. After earning a bachelor of arts degree in English literature from Swarthmore College in 1969, Schmidt Campbell taught English literature at Nkumbi International College in Zambia. She returned to the U.S. and studied art history at Syracuse University, graduating with a masters. She later earned a doctorate in humanities from Syracuse University. Her 1982 doctoral dissertation followed the life of the Afro-American artist, Romare Bearden, and his quest struggle to "create a timeless and enduring body of work without relinquishing his unique individual identity."

Career
In 1974, Schmidt Campbell became a curator of the Everson Museum of Art in Syracuse, New York and the art editor at Syracuse New Times.

Studio Museum in Harlem
Her career in New York began at the Studio Museum in Harlem during a time when the City was on the verge of bankruptcy and Harlem was in steep decline. Under her leadership, the Museum was transformed from a rented loft to the country's first accredited Black fine arts museum.

From 1977–1987, Schmidt Campbell served as executive director of the Studio Museum. During her tenure, Schmidt Campbell steered the museum from a struggling organization located in a loft space above a liquor store to a 60,000 sq. ft. building and into one of the nation's premier black fine-arts museums with an annual $2 million budget. At the time, the museum was the only one of its kind to be accredited by the American Association of Museums. Noticing the lack of a facility that could adequately communicate African-American art's "depth and range," she organized a series of exhibitions devoted to the country's leading black artists.

New York City Department of Cultural Affairs
In 1987, New York Mayor Ed Koch, invited Schmidt Campbell to serve as the City's cultural affairs commissioner. In this role, she led the Department of Cultural Affairs which oversees the operations and capital development of the city's major cultural institutions. As a commissioner, she gained a reputation as an advocate for large and small arts organizations throughout all five boroughs.

At the age of 40, Schmidt Campbell was sworn in as the Commissioner of the New York City Department of Cultural Affairs October 1987 by then-New York City Mayor Ed Koch. With an annual $172 million budget, the Department provides operating and capital improvement funds to 32 major institutions—including museums, theaters, zoos, and botanical gardens—and grants program money to hundreds of neighborhood arts groups. A few weeks into her tenure, the stock market crashed, whereupon the city government made major budget cuts. The Department's budget was initially cut by $7 million, but Schmidt Campbell was able to minimize the cuts to $1 million.

One of her main accomplishments was organizing and fundraising "New York and the Arts: A Cultural Affair," a campaign focused on promoting cultural activities throughout the city and encouraging attendance. Other accomplishments included a pilot program focused on introducing the arts to low-income youth.

In 1989, she was reappointed by Mayor Koch's successor, David Dinkins. At her swearing-in ceremony in 1990, she proposed that the city's budget on drug education should be reallocated to her department for cultural and recreational programs for schoolchildren, saying that "if our children can be addicted to the power of language and the excitement of ideas, if they have the benefit of the time and attention of creative adults who have only the  highest expectation of them, if excellence and discipline are the standards set for them, they will rise to the occasion."

In May 1990, the Smithsonian Institution named Schmidt Campbell to be the chairwoman of a 22-member advisory board to study ways to exhibit the heritage of black Americans on the National Mall, which laid the groundwork for the creation of the National Museum of African American History and Culture.

NYU Tisch School of the Arts
On October 1, 1991, Schmidt Campbell was named dean of the Tisch School of the Arts at New York University. During her tenure, Schmidt Campbell expanded the school's arts profile, including digital media in addition to theater, film, and television, increased the recruitment of a more diverse faculty and student body, and led an unprecedented capital campaign for the school. In 2008, Schmidt Campbell established the Tisch Talent Identification Process, a program that recruits high-performing, high-need students to the school.

Tisch also founded new disciplines and departments, "including a moving image archiving and preservation program, the Clive Davis Institute of Recorded Music and a dual M.B.A.-M.F.A. degree with the Stern School of Business at N.Y.U."

In September 2009, President Barack Obama appointed Schmidt Campbell as the vice chair of the President's Committee on the Arts and Humanities.

Spelman College Presidency (2015 – 2022) 
Schmidt Campbell assumed the role of president of Spelman College on August 1, 2015 where she succeeded Beverly Daniel Tatum. Under her leadership, Spelman moved from 77 to 57 on the U.S. News & World Report annual Best College rankings and ranked No.1 HBCU for the 13th year in a row. In addition, the College secured the No. 6 spot on U.S. News' inaugural list of Top Performers on Social Mobility.

On April 25, 2022, it was announced that Schmidt Campbell will be retiring and ending her tenure as president on June 30, 2022. She will be succeeded by American doctor Helene D. Gayle.

Awards and honors 
Schmidt Campbell currently sits on the boards of the Alfred P. Sloan Foundation, the Doris Duke Charitable Foundation, the High Museum of Art, the J. Paul Getty Trust, and is on the Advisory Boards of the Bonner Foundation, and the Association of Governing Boards of Universities and Colleges.

She was previously on the boards of the American Academy in Rome, the New York Shakespeare Festival, and the United Nations International School.

Schmidt Campbell is a fellow of the New York Institute for the Humanities and the American Academy of Arts and Sciences. She received a Candace Award from the National Coalition of 100 Black Women in 1986.

Schmidt Campbell holds several honorary degrees, including one from her alma mater, Swarthmore College in Pennsylvania as well as the College of New Rochelle, Colgate University, City University of New York, and Pace University.

At Syracuse, she has been honored with the Arents Pioneer Medal (1993), a Chancellor's Citation and the College of Arts and Sciences' Distinguished Alumni Award. She was also awarded an honorary degree (2021).

Personal life 
Schmidt Campbell lives in  Atlanta, Georgia. She and her husband, physicist George Campbell Jr., president emeritus of the Cooper Union, are the parents of three sons.

Selected works  
Schmidt Campbell has published books on variety of topics. Some of the books include:
 For this book, she won the 2018 Hooks National Book Award from the Benjamin L. Hooks Institute for Social Change at the University of Memphis.
 

Schmidt Campbell has contributed to several discussions, articles on higher education topics. In 2020, she penned an op-ed for The New York Times in response to how the College was affected by the Covid-19 pandemic. She also appeared on MSNBC's PoliticsNation with Al Sharpton to discuss how the coronavirus pandemic is impacting historically Black colleges and universities.

References

External links 

Educators from New York City
Swarthmore College alumni
Syracuse University College of Arts and Sciences alumni
Tisch School of the Arts faculty
Living people
Presidents of Spelman College
1947 births
African-American academics
American women academics
Women heads of universities and colleges
Philadelphia High School for Girls alumni
American academic administrators
African-American educators